Gary Sullivan is an Australian former professional rugby league footballer who played in the 1960s and 1970s. An Australian international and New South Wales interstate representative forward, he played club football in the New South Wales Rugby Football League Premiership for Newtown.

Rugby career 
After playing for Kurri Kurri, Sullivan moved to Sydney to play in the New South Wales Rugby Football League premiership for Newtown in 1970. After only six first-grade games he was selected for Australia's victorious 1970 World Cup squad at lock. Following Ron Coote's decision to stand down from representative football in 1972, Sullivan made his New South Wales début before being selected in two Tests against New Zealand. He scored two tries in Australia's 36–11 win at the SCG before playing in the Second Test in Brisbane. At the end of the year Sullivan was selected for Australia's 1972 World Cup campaign. He was selected to play at lock forward in the tournament final against Great Britain which was drawn at 10-10. 

Sullivan later played in the Newcastle Rugby League in the late 1970s.

In 2010 he was named at lock forward in Kurri Rugby League Club's team of the century.

Criminal activities 
Between 1985 and 1991, Sullivan with the help of his stepfather, Bill Orchard, stole more than $3 million in 14 separate armed robberies of banks and armored cars. These crimes took place in a variety of locations between Logan City, Brisbane, and the Gold Coast. 

In 1991, when Sullivan and his stepfather were finally apprehended, they had pulled off 6 out of the top 10 heists in total amount stolen in Queensland history. Once Sullivan and Orchard were apprehended, they both made individual confessions to at least some of the offenses.  

On December 13, 1991, Sullivan and Orchard were convicted of 12 offenses of Armed Robbery and 2 offenses of Armed Robbery in Accompany of Violence. Each were sentenced to 20 years in prison with eligibility of parole beginning after 7 years.

References

1947 births
Living people
Australia national rugby league team players
Australian bank robbers
Australian rugby league players
Criminals from New South Wales
Kurri Kurri Bulldogs players
Newtown Jets players
City New South Wales rugby league team players
Rugby league locks
Rugby league players from Kurri Kurri